Émilie Gral (born 2 August 1986) is a French paratriathlete, swimmer and politician. She is a departmental councillor candidate on the canton of Saint-Affrique, paratriathlete and former Paralympic swimmer. She was born without her left forearm.

Gral started swimming when she was six years old as a form of therapy for problems with her hips and back.

Gral was a departmental councillor candidate for the canton of Saint-Affrique in 2015.

References

1986 births
Living people
Sportspeople from Aveyron
Paralympic swimmers of France
Paratriathletes of France
French female triathletes
Swimmers at the 2004 Summer Paralympics
Swimmers at the 2008 Summer Paralympics
Medalists at the World Para Swimming Championships
S9-classified Paralympic swimmers
21st-century French women